Acoustic Attitude is a studio album by American country artist Barbara Mandrell. It was released on April 21, 1994 on Direct Records and contained 12 tracks. It was Mandrell's twenty-sixth studio recording released in her career and the first to be issued on the Direct label. Acoustic Attitude was a collection of re-recordings of Mandrell's most popular singles from her career. The album was originally sold on television and later released to digital retailers.

Background and recording
Barbara Mandrell was considered by writers to be one of country music's most successful artists during the 1970s and 1980s. Towards the end of 1980s, Mandrell's commercial performance started to wane. She left her major record label (Capitol Records) in 1991. In 1994, it was announced that a New York company called Direct Records would promote and distribute two new albums of Mandrell's material. The albums would be promoted through the label with the help of promotion on television. The album was marketed directly through The Nashville Network beginning in 1994. Acoustic Attitude would be the first of these albums released by the Direct label. According to the liner notes, the project was recorded in late 1993 in Nashville, Tennessee. The session was co-produced by Brent Rowan and Barbara Mandrell. It was the first studio album in Mandrell's career to credit her as a producer.

Content and release
Acoustic Attitude contained a total of 12 tracks. The album's 12 tracks were all newly reinterpreted acoustic versions of Mandrell's most popular songs and hits. Featured on the disc were re-recordings of Mandrell's four number one Billboard country singles: "Sleeping Single in a Double Bed" (1978), "(If Loving You Is Wrong) I Don't Want to Be Right" (1979), "Years" (1979) and "I Was Country When Country Wasn't Cool" (1981). Seven other re-recorded tracks were originally top ten Billboard country songs including "Tonight My Baby's Coming Home" (1971), "The Best of Strangers" (1980) and "To Me" (1984). The album was originally released on April 21, 1994 on Direct Records. It was originally distributed as a compact disc. At the time of its initial release, Acoustic Attitude was only sold on television. It was not available at the time for retail purchase. It was later made available to digital and streaming sites including Spotify.

Track listing

Personnel
All credits are adapted from the liner notes of Acoustic Attitude and AllMusic.

Musical personnel
 Charlie Bundy – Acoustic bass guitar, background vocals
 Roger Eaton – Acoustic guitar, background vocals
 Shawn Fitcher – Drums
 Michael Jones – Dobro, pedabro
 Barbara Mandrell – Lead vocals
 Dino Pastin – Harmonica, saxophone, vibraphone
 Brent Rowan – Acoustic guitar, dobro
 Dave Salyer – Acoustic guitar
 Steve Thomas – Fiddle, mandolin
 Chris Walters – Piano

Technical personnel
 Paul Aresu – Photography
 Alex Bartchez – Assistant engineer
 Derek Bason – Assistant engineer
 John Guess – Mixing engineer
 Stephen Jacaruso – Design
 Barbara Mandrell – Producer
 Keith Odle – Engineer
 Brent Rowan – Producer
 Denny Somach – Project coordinator
 Liz Vap – Art direction, design
 Chris Walters – Musical director
 Marty Williams – Assistant engineer, mixing engineer

Release history

References

1994 albums
Albums produced by Brent Rowan
Barbara Mandrell albums